is a Japanese film director / screenwriter who was born in Yokohama, Kanagawa Prefecture, and grew up in Fukaya, Saitama Prefecture.

After a number of short films, including Obsession and Seven Drives which were screened at the Yubari International Fantastic Film Festival in 2003 and 2004, Irie directed two softcore erotic V-Cinema videos in 2007, Cream Lemon 7 and Swimsuit Spy - SPY GIRLS. The latter video, an erotic comedy, starred AV Idol Mihiro.

In 2009 the second feature film he directed, won the grand prize in the Off Theatre Competition at the Yubari International Fantastic Film Festival. It also earned Irie the Directors Guild of Japan New Directors Award. The film follows four friends from suburban Fukuya (punned on Fukaya) who dream of becoming rap stars. The mostly amateur cast also included adult video actress Mihiro.

Filmography

Feature films
 Japonica Virus (2006)
 8000 Miles (2009)
 8000 Miles 2: Girl Rappers (2010)
 Hibi Rock (2014)
 Joker Game (2015)
 Confession of Murder (2017)
 Vigilante (2017)
 Gangoose (2018)
 AI Amok (2020)
 Ninja Girl (2021)
 The Cursed Sanctuary X (2021)
 Nemesis: The Movie (2023)

V-Cinema
  (2007)
  (2007)

Television
Nemesis (2021)
Uzukawamura Jiken (2022)

References

External links
 

Japanese film directors
Japanese screenwriters
1979 births
People from Yokohama
Living people